Tancrède Synave was a French painter. He was born in 1870 and died in 1936. He is known for his portraits of women in the Parisian high society.

Sources and links
 Findartinfo Tancrède Synave's artworks in auctions.
 Artnet Photos of Tancrède Synave's paintings.

1870 births
19th-century French painters
French male painters
20th-century French painters
20th-century French male artists
Académie Julian alumni
1936 deaths
19th-century French male artists